Julius Rehborn (30 December 1899 – 27 November 1987) was a German diver who competed in the 1928 Summer Olympics. He finished ninth in the 10 metre platform event. His younger sisters were also Olympic athletes: Hanni was a diver and Anni a swimmer.

References

1899 births
1987 deaths
German male divers
Olympic divers of Germany
Divers at the 1928 Summer Olympics
20th-century German people